Major-General Than Theik is a Burmese military officer and current commander of Myanmar's Northwestern Command, which encompasses Sagaing Region. He was appointed to the role in January 2023, replacing Phyo Thant, who had overseen mass military casualties in the command. Sagaing Region, as part of the Bamar heartland, has been a major centre of the civilian resistance in the 2021–2023 Myanmar civil war, which emerged in the aftermath of the 2021 Myanmar coup d'etat. In January 2023, he was sanctioned by the Canadian government.

Military career 
Than Hteik graduated from the 38th batch of the Defence Services Academy. Prior to his promotion as the commander of the Northwestern Command, he commanded military operations in Kalay.

See also 

 2021–2023 Myanmar civil war
 State Administration Council
 Tatmadaw

References 

Living people
Burmese generals
Defence Services Academy alumni
Year of birth missing (living people)